Events from the year 1991 in the United States.

Incumbents

Federal government 
 President: George H. W. Bush (R-Texas)
 Vice President: Dan Quayle (R-Indiana)
 Chief Justice: William Rehnquist (Wisconsin)
 Speaker of the House of Representatives: Tom Foley (D-Washington)
 Senate Majority Leader: George J. Mitchell (D-Maine)
 Congress: 101st (until January 3), 102nd (starting January 3)

Events

January

 January 2 – Sharon Pratt Dixon is sworn in as mayor of the District of Columbia, becoming the first African-American woman to be mayor of a major U.S. city.
 January 7 – United States Secretary of Defense Dick Cheney cancels the $57,000,000,000 order for the McDonnell Douglas A-12 Avenger II.
 January 8 – Pan American World Airways files for bankruptcy protection.
 January 9 – United States Secretary of State James Baker meets with Iraqi foreign minister Tariq Aziz, but fails to produce a plan for Iraq to withdraw its troops from Kuwait.
 January 12 – Gulf War: The Congress of the United States passes a resolution authorizing the use of military force to liberate Kuwait.
 January 16 – U.S. serial killer Aileen Wuornos confesses to the murders of six men.
 January 17 – Gulf War: Operation Desert Storm begins with airstrikes against Iraq.
 January 18 – Eastern Air Lines ceases operations after flying for two years under bankruptcy protection.
 January 25 – President George H. W. Bush names Rep. Edward Rell Madigan as United States Secretary of Agriculture, replacing Clayton Keith Yeutter, who had been elected Chairman of the Republican National Committee.
 January 26 – In Washington, D.C., tens of thousands of people rally against the Persian Gulf War.
 January 27 – Super Bowl XXV: The New York Giants defeat the Buffalo Bills 20–19 at Tampa Stadium in Tampa, Florida.
 January 29
 George H. W. Bush delivers his second State of the Union Address.
 The first attempt to cure cancer by gene therapy takes place at the National Cancer Institute in Bethesda, Maryland.

February

 February – The early 1990s recession ends.
 February 1 – A USAir Boeing 737-300, Flight 1493 collides with a SkyWest Airlines Fairchild Metroliner, Flight 5569 at Los Angeles International Airport, killing 34 people.
 February 5 – A Michigan court bars Dr. Jack Kevorkian from assisting in suicides.
 February 7 – Gulf War: Ground troops cross the Saudi Arabian border and enter Kuwait, thus starting the ground phase of the war.
 February 9 – The Adventures of Pete & Pete debuts on Nickelodeon.
 February 13 – Gulf War: Two laser-guided bombs destroy an underground bunker in Baghdad, killing 314 Iraqis including 130 children. United States military intelligence claims the structure was transmitting military signals but Iraqi officials identify it as a bomb shelter.
 February 22 – Gulf War: Iraq accepts a Russian-proposed cease fire agreement. The U.S. rejects the agreement, but says that retreating Iraqi forces will not be attacked if they leave Kuwait within 24 hours.
 February 23 – The One Meridian Plaza fire in Philadelphia, Pennsylvania kills three firefighters and destroys eight floors of the building.
 February 25 – Gulf War: Part of an Iraqi Scud missile hits an American military barracks in Dhahran, Saudi Arabia, killing 29 and injuring 99 U.S. soldiers. It is the single most devastating attack on U.S. forces during the war.
 February 26 – Gulf War: On Baghdad radio, Iraqi President Saddam Hussein announces the withdrawal of Iraqi troops from Kuwait. Iraqi soldiers set fire to Kuwaiti oil fields as they retreat.
 February 27 – Gulf War: U.S. President George H. W. Bush announces that "Kuwait is liberated".
 February 28 – Impostor James Hogue is exposed at Princeton University.

March
 March 1 – Clayton Keith Yeutter leaves his position as the United States Secretary of Agriculture.
 March 3 
An amateur video captures the beating of Rodney King by Los Angeles, California police officers.
United Airlines Flight 585 crashes in Colorado Springs, Colorado, killing all 25 people on board.
 March 10 – Gulf War – Operation Phase Echo: 540,000 American troops begin to leave the Persian Gulf.
 March 13 – The United States Department of Justice announces that Exxon has agreed to pay $1,000,000,000 for the clean-up of the Exxon Valdez oil spill in Alaska.
 March 15 
Four Los Angeles, California police officers are indicted for the videotaped March 3 beating of motorist Rodney King during an arrest.
Germany formally regains complete independence after the four post-World War II occupying powers (France, the United Kingdom, the United States and the Soviet Union) relinquish all remaining rights.
 March 18 – Get the Picture debuts on Nickelodeon. 
 March 25 – The 63rd Academy Awards, hosted by Billy Crystal, are held at Shrine Auditorium in Los Angeles. Kevin Costner's Dances with Wolves wins seven awards out of 12 nominations, including Best Picture and Best Director. The telecast garners nearly 43 million viewers.
 March 30 – Northern Michigan University wins the NCAA Division I title in hockey, 8–7 in the third overtime against Boston University.

April
 April 4 
Merion air disaster: Senator John Heinz of Pennsylvania and six others are killed when a helicopter collides with their plane over Merion, Pennsylvania.
William Kennedy Smith, a nephew of U.S. Senator Ted Kennedy, is identified as a suspect in an alleged Palm Beach, Florida sexual assault.
1991 Sacramento hostage crisis: Four gunmen take 41 people hostage at a Good Guys! electronics store in Sacramento, California. Three hostages, as well as three of the four hostage-takers, are killed.
 April 5 – Former Senator John Tower and 22 others are killed in an airplane crash in Brunswick, Georgia.
 April 17 – The Dow Jones Industrial Average closes above 3,000 for the first time ever, at 3,004.46.
 April 26 – Seventy tornadoes break out in the central United States, killing 17 people. The most notable tornado of the day strikes Andover, Kansas.

May
 May 5 – 1991 Washington, D.C. riot: A riot breaks out in the Mt. Pleasant section of Washington, D.C. after police shoot a Salvadorean man.
 May 6 – Time magazine publishes "The Thriving Cult of Greed and Power", an article highly critical of the Scientology organization.
 May 16 – Queen Elizabeth II becomes the first British monarch to address the United States Congress.
 May 25 – The Pittsburgh Penguins defeat the Minnesota North Stars 8–0 in Game 6 to win their first Stanley Cup in franchise history.

June
 June 5 – STS-40: Space Shuttle Columbia carries the Spacelab Life Sciences 1 module into orbit.
 June 10 – As she was finishing school for the day, 11-year-old Jaycee Lee Dugard is kidnapped. She will not be found for 18 years.
 June 12 – The Chicago Bulls win their first NBA championship by defeating the Los Angeles Lakers.
 June 13 – A spectator is killed by lightning at the U.S. Open.
 June 17 – 12th U.S. President Zachary Taylor, who died 141 years earlier in 1850, is exhumed to discover whether or not his death was caused by arsenic poisoning, instead of acute gastrointestinal illness; no trace of arsenic is found.
June 23 – Sonic the Hedgehog is released in the United States. Nearly one million copies were sold in the United States by Christmas 1991, and nearly 2 million copies were sold worldwide by the end of 1991.
June 27 – Supreme Court Justice Thurgood Marshall announces his retirement from the Supreme Court due to declining health. In his retirement press conference on the following day, he expressed his view that race should not be the basis in selecting his successor.
 June 28 – The 5.6  Sierra Madre earthquake shook the Greater Los Angeles Area with a maximum Mercalli intensity of VII (Very strong), causing two deaths, 27–40 injuries, and $33.5–40 million in losses.

July

 July 1 – President George H. W. Bush nominates Clarence Thomas as the replacement for Associate Justice Thurgood Marshall. 
 July 4 – Salute Your Shorts debuts on Nickelodeon.
 July 11 – A solar Eclipse of record totality occurs, seen first in Hawaii. It then entered Mexico with the path directly crossing Cabo San Lucas and Mexico City, where it was seen by 20,000,000 inhabitants, and finally ended in Colombia in South America.
 July 22 
Boxer Mike Tyson is arrested and charged with raping Miss Black America contestant Desiree Washington three days earlier, in Indianapolis, Indiana.
Serial killer Jeffrey Dahmer is arrested after the remains of eleven men and boys are found in his Milwaukee, Wisconsin apartment. Police soon find out that he is involved in six more murders.
 July 31 – The United States and the Soviet Union sign the START I treaty limiting strategic nuclear weapons.

August
 August 11 – Nickelodeon introduces its series of Nicktoons, with Doug, Rugrats and The Ren & Stimpy Show the first three to air.
 August 19 – Hurricane Bob hits the Northeastern United States.
 August 23 – The Super Nintendo Entertainment System (or "Super Nintendo") is first released in the United States.
 August 31 – What Would You Do? debuts on Nickelodeon.

September
 September 2 – Dissolution of the Soviet Union: The United States recognizes the independence of Estonia, Latvia and Lithuania.
 September 3 – In Hamlet, North Carolina, a grease fire breaks out at the Imperial Foods chicken processing plant, killing 25 people.
 September 8–12 – Tailhook scandal: At the 35th Annual Tailhook Symposium in Las Vegas, 83 women and seven men are assaulted.
 September 11 – Continental Express Flight 2574 crashes in Texas.
 September 16 – The trial of the deposed Panamanian dictator Manuel Noriega begins in the United States.
 September 20–21 – In Sandy, Utah, several patients are held hostage and a nurse is killed in the Alta View Hospital hostage incident.
 September 24 – Nirvana releases their most popular album, Nevermind, which ultimately sells 11 million copies in the United States.

October

 October 2 – Arkansas Governor Bill Clinton announces he will seek the 1992 Democratic nomination for President of the United States.
 October 11–13 – The U.S. Senate Judiciary Committee interviews both Supreme Court candidate Clarence Thomas and former aide Anita Hill, who alleges that Thomas sexually harassed her while she worked for him.
 October 15 – United States Senate votes 52–48 to confirm Judge Clarence Thomas to the Supreme Court of the United States.
 October 16 – George Hennard guns down 24 people in a restaurant in Killeen, Texas before committing suicide. It would be the largest mass shooting by a single person in the United States until 2007. 
 October 20 – The Oakland Hills firestorm kills 25 people and destroys 3,469 homes and apartments.
 October 27 – The Minnesota Twins win the World Series against the Atlanta Braves.
 October 29 – The American Galileo spacecraft makes its closest approach to 951 Gaspra, becoming the first probe to visit an asteroid.

November
 November 1 – University of Iowa shooting: Former alumnus Gang Lu kills five people before committing suicide.
 November 5 – David Duke, a white separatist running as a Republican, loses the Louisiana Governor's race to Democratic candidate Edwin Edwards, by an overwhelming margin despite winning the majority of the white vote.
 November 7 – Los Angeles Lakers point guard Magic Johnson announces that he has HIV, effectively ending his NBA career.
 November 14
 American and British authorities announce indictments against two Libyan intelligence officials in connection with the bombing of Pan Am Flight 103.
 In Royal Oak, Michigan, a fired United States Postal Service employee goes on a shooting rampage, killing four people and wounding five others before committing suicide.
 November 22 – Walt Disney Pictures' 30th feature film, Beauty and the Beast, is released, receiving widespread acclaim and box office success, later becoming the first animated film to be nominated for the Academy Award for Best Picture at the 64th Academy Awards in early 1992.
November 24 – Queen lead singer Freddie Mercury dies from AIDS at 45 years old, one day after making his diagnosis public.
 November 30 – The United States win the first ever FIFA Women's World Cup in China against Norway in the Final.

December

 December 4 – Journalist Terry A. Anderson is released after seven years' captivity as a hostage in Beirut (the last and longest-held American hostage in Lebanon).
 December 7 – The 50th anniversary of the Attack on Pearl Harbor.
 December 20 – A Missouri court imposes a death sentence on Palestinian militant Zein Isa and his wife Maria, for the honor killing of their daughter Palestina.
 December 25–26 – The Cold War ends as President of the Soviet Union Mikhail Gorbachev resigns and the Soviet Union dissolves.

Undated
Able Newspaper, a monthly journal is founded.
Corelis, a private company is founded in Cerritos, California.
EOS CCA, a private debt collection business is founded.
Lawyers Have Heart event is founded in Washington, D.C.

Ongoing
 Cold War (1947–1991)
 Gulf War (1990–1991)
 Iraqi no-fly zones (1991–2003)

Births

January 

 January 1
 Darius Slay, football player
 Mark L. Young, actor
 January 4 – Charles Melton, actor and model
 January 8
 Shaun Abreu, politician and tenants' rights attorney
 Zachary Donohue, ice dancer
 January 9 – 3LAU, DJ and electronic dance music producer
 January 12
 Raquel González, wrestler
 Alex Wood, baseball player
 January 14 – Jeanine Mason, actress and dancer
 January 17 
 Trevor Bauer, baseball player
 Willa Fitzgerald, actress
 January 19 – Erin Sanders, actress
 January 20 – Ciara Hanna, actress and model
 January 23 – Steve Birnbaum, soccer player
 January 26 – Rachel DiPillo, actress
 January 27 – Daniel Hemric, stock car driver
 January 28
 Mallory Burdette, tennis player
 C.J. Harris, singer (d. 2023)
 January 30 – videogamedunkey, YouTuber 
 January 31 – Trinity K. Bonet, drag queen

February 

 February 1 – Jasmine Tookes, model
 February 2 – Matthew Boyd, baseball player
 February 3 
 Gavin Escobar, football player (d. 2022)
 Glenn McCuen, actor, model and gymnast
 February 5 – Kelvin Benjamin, football player
 February 7 – Gabbie Hanna, youtuber
 February 9 – Logan Ryan, football player
 February 10
C. J. Anderson, football player
Emma Roberts, actress
 February 11 – Christofer Drew, singer
 February 12
 Casey Abrams, singer
 Devin Patrick Kelley, mass murderer
 February 14 – J.J. Wilcox, football player
 February 15 – Rich Swann, wrestler
 February 16
 Maurice Alexander, football player
 Terrence Boyd, soccer player
 Micah Stephen Williams, actor
 February 18
 Malese Jow, actress and singer
 Jeremy Allen White, actor
 February 19 
 Trevor Bayne, race car driver
 Adreian Payne, basketball player (d. 2022)
 February 22
 Mariah Bullock, American-born Samoan footballer
 Khalil Mack, American football player
 February 24 
 Emily DiDonato, model
 Madison Hubbell, ice dancer
 O'Shea Jackson Jr., rapper, actor, and son of Ice Cube
 February 25
 Levi Benton, singer and frontman for Miss May I
 Kristie Mewis, soccer player
 Tony Oller, actor and singer

March 

 March 6
 Nicole Fox, fashion model and actress
Lex Luger, musician and record producer
Tyler, the Creator, rapper
 March 7
 Chuck Aoki, Paralympic wheelchair rugby player and a former wheelchair basketball player
 Ian Clark, basketball player
 March 8
 Kina Collins, community organizer, activist, and political candidate
 Devon Werkheiser, actor, singer-songwriter, and musician
 March 16
 Reggie Bullock, basketball player
 Wolfgang Van Halen, musician
 March 18 – Travis Frederick, American football player
 March 19 – Garrett Clayton, actor, dancer and singer
 March 23 – Madelyn Deutch, actress, director, musician, and writer
 March 25 – Seychelle Gabriel, actress
 March 26 – Ari Lennox, R&B singer
 March 28
 Amy Bruckner, actress and singer
 Derek Carr, quarterback
 March 29 – Hayley McFarland, actress
 March 30
 Mia Carruthers, singer/songwriter
 Joey Cook, singer
 March 31 – Lukas Magyar, singer and frontman for Veil of Maya

April 

 April 2 – Quavo, rapper
 April 3 – Hayley Kiyoko, singer and actress
 April 4 
 Jamie Lynn Spears, actress and sister of Britney Spears
 Jacquelyn Jablonski, model
 Manuel Gutierrez Jr., makeup youtuber
 April 5 – Hunter March, TV host, actor and producer
 April 10
 Conor Leslie, actress and model
 AJ Michalka, singer and actress
 Royce White, basketball player and civil rights activist
 April 11
Brennan Poole, racing driver
Telvin Smith, American football player
 April 12 – Jack Cooley, basketball player
 April 13 – Dylan Penn, model and actress
 April 15 – Jordan Anderson, professional stock car racing driver and team owner
 April 16 – Nolan Arenado, baseball player
 April 19 – Kelly Olynyk, basketball player
 April 20
 Luke Kuechly, football player
 Allie Will, tennis player
 April 22 – Nick Comoroto, pro wrestler
 April 23
 Britt Baker, professional wrestler and dentist 
 Caleb Johnson, singer 
 April 25 – Alex Shibutani, ice dancer
 April 27 – Darren Barnet, actor
 April 28 – Cheslie Kryst, beauty queen and television correspondent (d. 2022)
 April 30 – Travis Scott, rapper

May 

 May 1
 Creagen Dow, actor, producer, and screenwriter
 Marcus Stroman, baseball player
 Bradley Roby, football player
 May 7
 Rueben Randle, football player 
 Devyn A. Tyler, actress
 May 10 – Kenny Beats, record producer
 May 12 
 Jennifer Damiano, Filipino singer and actor
 Kelsey Lu, singer
 May 13 – Scarlett Bordeaux, professional wrestler and model
 May 14 – Ryland Adams, Youtuber and internet personality
 May 16 – Joey Graceffa, internet personality, actor and author
 May 17
 Daniel Curtis Lee, actor, comedian, and rapper
 DJ Akademiks, Jamaican-American blogger
 May 19 – Brittani Kline, model
 May 21 – Sarah Ramos, actress
 May 23 – Aaron Donald, football player
 May 24 – Drew Binsky, travel blogger and vlogger
 May 25 – Derrick Williams, basketball player
 May 26 – Julianna Rose Mauriello, stage actress
 May 27 – Zeke Upshaw, basketball player (d. 2018)
 May 29 – Kristen Alderson, actress
 May 31 
 Farrah Abraham, reality television personality
 Azealia Banks, rapper, singer, songwriter, and actress

June 

 June 1 – Zazie Beetz, German-born actress
 June 4 
 Jordan Hinson, actress
 Quincy, actor and singer
 Sykkuno, streamer
 June 5 – Tyler Blevins, gamer
 June 7
 Emily Ratajkowski, model and actress
 Fetty Wap, rapper
 June 10 – Alexa Knierim, pair skater
 June 12 – Louisa Gummer, model
 June 15 – Hasim Rahman Jr., boxer
 June 18 – Willa Holland, model and actress
 June 19 – Jake Heaps, football player
 June 20 – Alexis Haines, television personality and model
 June 23 – Katie Armiger, singer
 June 24
 Dexter Darden, actor
 Max Ehrich, actor
 June 25 – Jessika Carr, wrestler
 June 26 – Amanda Cerny, youtuber
 June 27
 Rayvon Owen, singer
 Kyle Smaine, freestyle skier (d. 2023)
 Madylin Sweeten, actress
 June 29
 Kawhi Leonard, basketball player
 Addison Timlin, actress

July 

 July 1 – Michael Wacha, baseball player
 July 3
 Cameron Brate, football player
 Grant Rosenmeyer, actor
 July 5 – Jason Dolley, actor
 July 9 
 Mitchel Musso, actor, musician and singer
 Riley Reid, pornographic actress
 July 11 – Tom Shields, Olympic swimmer
 July 12
 Erik Per Sullivan, actor
 Dexter Roberts, singer
 July 14 – Diamante, wrestler
 July 15 – Derrick Favors, basketball player
 July 16 – Alexandra Shipp, actress
 July 18 – Karina Pasian, singer and pianist
 July 20 – Alec Burks, basketball player
 July 25 – Hasan Piker, progressive youtuber
 July 27 – Matt DiBenedetto, race car driver
 July 29 – Maestro Harrell, actor
 July 30 – Jason Richardson, guitarist for Born of Osiris and Chelsea Grin

August 

 August 2 – Skyler Day, actress and singer
 August 5 – Brooke Marie Bridges, actress
 August 7 – Mike Trout, baseball player
 August 9 – Alexa Bliss, wrestler
 August 10 – Maci Bookout, reality star
 August 12 – Lakeith Stanfield, actor
 August 16
 Bia, rapper
 Young Thug, hip hop artist
 Hayley Chase, actress
 August 17 – Austin Butler, actor
 August 18 – Brianna Rollins-McNeal, Olympic track and field athlete
 August 19 – Alison Parker, news reporter (died 2015)
 August 23 – Chris Hubbard, football player
 August 26
 Ruby Aldridge, fashion model
 Ryan Burroughs, rugby player
 Jessie Diggins, cross-country skier
 Dylan O'Brien, actor
 August 28
 Kyle Massey, actor
 Samuel Larsen, actor and singer

September 

 September 4 – Carter Jenkins, actor
 September 6 
 Tyler Austin, baseball player
 Joe Harris, basketball player
 September 9
 Kelsey Asbille, actress
 Lauren Daigle, singer/songwriter
 Hunter Hayes, singer/songwriter, record producer, and multi-instrumentalist
 September 10 – Hannah Hodson, actress
 September 11 – Zach Holmes, stunt performer and television personality
 September 14 
 Ronnie Hillman, American football player (d. 2022)
 Shayne Topp, actor and comedian
 September 17
 Scott Hoying, musician
 Melanie Moore, dancer
 September 19 – Keah Brown, activist
 September 22 – Chelsea Tavares, actress 
 September 23 – Melanie Oudin, tennis player
 September 25
 Emmy Clarke, actress
 Alexander Rossi, race car driver
 September 30
 David Bakhtiari, football player
 Mat Madiro, drummer

October 

 October 1
 Gus Kenworthy, British-born Olympic freestyle skier, actor, and YouTuber
 Sam Shankland, chess player
 October 4 – Cole Hawkins, actor
 October 5 – Jackson Rogow, actor
 October 6 – Roshon Fegan, actor
 October 7 – Nicole Jung, singer
 October 10 – Michael Carter-Williams, basketball player
 October 11 – Toby Fox, video game developer and composer
 October 18 – Tyler Posey, actor and musician
 October 19
 Colton Dixon, musician
 Christopher Gerse, actor
 October 20 – Kirsten Olson, figure skater and actress
 October 23 – Sophie Oda, Japanese-American actress
 October 27 – Bryan Craig, actor
 October 29
 Trey Burton, football player
 Marcus Lattimore, football player
 October 31 – Kenny Hilliard, football player

November 

 November 1 – Anthony Ramos, actor
 November 4
 Bee Vang, actor
 Adriana Chechik, pornographic actress
 November 6 – Pierson Fodé, actor and model
 November 8 – Riker Lynch, singer and actor
 November 11 – Christa B. Allen, actress
 November 13 – Matt Bennett, actor
 November 14
 Beau Allen, football player
 Graham Patrick Martin, film and television actor
 November 15 – Shailene Woodley, actress
 November 20 – Lily Ki, internet personality
 November 25 
 Kyler Fackrell, American football player
 Jamie Grace, musician and actress
 Kevin Woo, American-born South Korean singer and dancer

December 

 December 1 
 Rakeem Christmas, basketball player
 Noel Acciari, ice hockey player
 December 2
 Brandon Knight, basketball player
 Charlie Puth, singer
 December 4
 Hayley Arceneaux, youngest American in space and first astronaut with a prosthetic limb
 Reality Winner, intelligence specialist convicted of espionage
 December 5 – Christian Yelich, baseball player
 December 6
 Jeramey Anderson, politician
 CoCo Vandeweghe, tennis player
 December 9 – PnB Rock, rapper (d. 2022)
 December 10 
 Dion Waiters, basketball player
 Eric Reid, American football player
 December 12
 Jasmine Murray, singer
 Wallis Currie-Wood, actress
 December 13 – Jay Greenberg, composer
 December 14 – Offset, rapper
 December 15
 Eunice Cho, actress
 Conor Daly, race car driver
 Alana Haim, musician and actress
 December 17 – Daniel Tay, actor
 December 19
 Libe Barer, actress
 Edwin Jackson, football player (d. 2018)
 December 20
 Hunter Gomez, actor
 Jillian Rose Reed, actress
 December 22 – DaBaby, rapper
 December 24 – Vincent Caso, actor and entrepreneur
 December 26
 Jackson Jeffcoat, football player
 Eden Sher, actress
 December 27 – Chloe Bridges, actress
 December 30 – Tyler Carter, musician, singer/songwriter, and frontman for ISSUES (2012-2020) and Woe, Is Me (2009-2011)

Deaths

January

 January 3 – Luke Appling, American baseball player (Chicago White Sox) and member of the MLB Hall of Fame (b. 1907)
 January 7 – Everett Bidwell, American politician  (b. 1899)
 January 11 – Carl David Anderson, American physicist (b. 1905)
 January 12 – Mary Francis Shura, American writer (b. 1923)
 January 18 – Hamilton Fish III, American soldier and politician (b. 1888)
 January 19 – John Russell, American actor (b. 1921)
 January 28 – Red Grange, American football player (b. 1903)
 January 29 – John McIntire, American actor (b. 1907)
 January 30
 John Bardeen, American physicist (b. 1908)
 Clifton C. Edom, American photojournalism educator (b. 1907)

February

 February 1 – Carol Dempster, American actress (b. 1901)
 February 2 – Pete Axthelm, American sportswriter (b. 1943)
 February 3
 Nancy Kulp, American actress (b. 1921)
 Ed Russenholt, first US weather presenter (b. 1890)
 February 5 – Dean Jagger, American actor (b. 1903)
 February 6 – Danny Thomas, American singer, comedian, and actor (b. 1912)
 February 10 – Bernard Lee, American civil rights activist (b. 1935)
 February 14 
 John A. McCone, American politician (b. 1902)
 Neta Snook, American aviator (b. 1896)
 February 21 – John Sherman Cooper, American politician (b. 1901)
 February 24
 George Gobel, American comedian (b. 1919)
 Jean Rogers, American actress (b. 1916)

March

 March 3 – Arthur Murray, American dancer and dance instructor (b. 1895)
 March 7 – Cool Papa Bell, American baseball player (b. 1903)
 March 14
 Howard Ashman, American lyricist (b. 1950)
 Doc Pomus, American composer (b. 1925)
 March 15 – George Sherman, American film director (b. 1908)
 March 18 – Vilma Bánky, Hungarian-born actress (b. 1901)
 March 21 – Leo Fender, American instrument maker (b. 1909)
 March 23 – Margaret Atwood Judson, historian and author (b. 1899)
 March 27 – Aldo Ray, American actor (b. 1926)
 March 29 – Lee Atwater, American political consultant and strategist (b. 1951)

April

 April 1 – Martha Graham, American dancer and choreographer (b. 1894)
 April 3 – Charles Goren, American bridge player, writer, and columnist (b. 1901)
 April 4 – John Heinz, American politician (b. 1938)
 April 5
 Sonny Carter, American astronaut (b. 1947)
 John Tower, American politician (b. 1925)
 April 7 – Ruth Page, American ballerina and choreographer (b. 1899)
 April 9 – Forrest Towns, American Olympic athlete (b. 1914)
 April 10
 Kevin Peter Hall, American actor (b. 1955)
 Natalie Schafer, American actress (b. 1900)
 April 11 – Dick Manning, Russian-born American songwriter (b. 1912)
 April 20 – Don Siegel, American film director (b. 1912)
 April 23 – Johnny Thunders, American musician (b. 1952)
 April 26
 Carmine Coppola, American composer and conductor (b. 1910)
 Emily McLaughlin, American actress (b. 1928)
 William Andrew Paton, founder of the American Accounting Association in 1916, (b. 1889)
 April 28
 Paul E. Klopsteg, American physicist (b. 1889)
 Floyd McKissick, American lawyer and civil rights activist (b. 1922)
 Lee Wulff, American conservationist and fisherman (b. 1905)

May
 May 1 – Richard Thorpe, American film director (b. 1896)
 May 3 – Jerzy Kosiński, Polish-American writer (b. 1933)
 May 6 – Wilfrid Hyde-White, British actor (b. 1903)
 May 7 – Dennis Crosby, American singer (b. 1934)
 May 22 – Derrick Henry Lehmer, American mathematician (b. 1905)
 May 24 – Gene Clark, American singer-songwriter (b. 1944)
 May 27 Konerak Sinthasomphone, One of Jeffrey Dahmer’s Victim (b. 1976)
 May 29 – Coral Browne, Australian actress (b. 1913)

June

 June 1 – David Ruffin, American singer (b. 1941)
 June 3 – Eva Le Gallienne, English-born actress (b. 1899)
 June 4 – MC Trouble, American rapper (b. 1970)
 June 5
 Evelyn Boucher, British silent film actress (b. 1892)
 Min Chueh Chang,  Chinese-born American reproductive biologist (b. 1908)
 Larry Kert, American actor (b. 1930)
 June 6 – Stan Getz, American jazz saxophonist (b. 1927)
 June 8 – Bertice Reading, American actress and singer (b. 1933)
 June 9 – Claudio Arrau, Chilean-born pianist (b. 1903)
 June 15 – Happy Chandler, 2nd commissioner of Major League Baseball (b. 1898)
 June 18 – Joan Caulfield, American actress (b. 1922)
 June 19 – Jean Arthur, American actress (b. 1900)
 June 25 – Michael Heidelberger, American immunologist  (b. 1888)

July

 July 1 – Michael Landon, American actor (b. 1936)
 July 2 – Lee Remick, American actress (b. 1935)
 July 4 – Henry Koerner, Austrian-born American painter and graphic designer (b. 1915)
 July 5
 Mildred Dunnock, American actress (b. 1901)
 Howard Nemerov, American poet (b. 1920)
 July 8 – James Franciscus, American actor (b. 1934)
 July 15
 Bert Convy, American actor, singer, game show host and television personality (b. 1933)
 Roger Revelle, American scientist and scholar (b. 1909)
 July 16 – Robert Motherwell, American painter (b. 1915)
 July 17 – Arthur Raymond Brooks, American World War I fighter ace (b. 1895)

August

 August 1 – Chris Short, American baseball pitcher (b. 1937)
 August 5
 Paul Brown, American football coach (b. 1908)
 Sam Goodman, American gospel singer (b. 1931)
 August 6 – Harry Reasoner, American journalist and newscaster (b. 1923)
 August 8
 Julissa Gomez, American gymnast (b. 1972)
 James Irwin, American astronaut (b. 1930)
 August 11 – J.D. McDuffie, American NASCAR driver (b. 1938)
 August 13 – James Roosevelt, American businessman and politician (b. 1907)
 August 14 – Richard A. Snelling, American politician (b. 1927)
 August 22
Colleen Dewhurst, Canadian-born American actress (b. 1924)
 Jane Stafford, American medical writer and chemist (b. 1899)
 August 23 
 Florence B. Seibert, American biochemist (b. 1897)
 Mildred Trotter, American forensic anthropologist (b. 1899)
 August 25 – Niven Busch, American novelist and screenwriter (b. 1903)

September

 September 3 – Frank Capra, Italian-born American film director (b. 1897)
 September 4
 Charlie Barnet, American jazz saxophonist (b. 1913)
 Tom Tryon, American actor and writer (b. 1926)
 Dottie West, American singer (b. 1932) 
 September 6 – Donald Henry Gaskins, American serial killer (b. 1933)
 September 7 – Edwin McMillan, American chemist (b. 1917)
 September 8
 Brad Davis, American actor (b. 1949)
 Alex North, American film composer (b. 1910)
 Nell Donnelly Reed, American fashion designer and businesswoman (b. 1889)
 September 12 – Chris Von Erich, American professional wrestler (b. 1969)
 September 13 – Joe Pasternak, Hungarian-born film director (b. 1901)
 September 14
 Russell Lynes, American art historian, photographer, and author (b. 1910)
 Lisa Michelson, American voice actress (b. 1958)
 September 15 – John Hoyt, American actor (b. 1905)
 September 17 – Frank H. Netter, American artist, physician, and medical illustrator (b. 1906)
 September 24 – Dr. Seuss, American author (b. 1904)
 September 25 – Barbara Rose Johns, American civil rights activist (b. 1935)
 September 28 – Miles Davis, American jazz trumpeter (b. 1926)
 September 29 – Grace Zaring Stone, American writer (b. 1891)

October

 October 6 – Florence B. Seibert, American biochemist (b. 1897)
 October 9 – Thalmus Rasulala, American actor (b. 1939)
 October 11 – Redd Foxx, American comedian and actor (b. 1922)
 October 12
 Aline MacMahon, American actress (b. 1899)
 Regis Toomey, American actor (b. 1898)
 October 17 – Tennessee Ernie Ford, American singer (b. 1919)
 October 24 – Gene Roddenberry, American television producer (b. 1921)
 October 25 – Bill Graham, American promoter (b. 1931)
 October 27 – Howard Kingsbury, American Olympic rower – Men's eights (b. 1904)
 October 28 – Sylvia Fine, American lyricist (b. 1913)
 October 31 – Joseph Papp, American theater director and producer (b. 1921)

November

 November 2 
 Irwin Allen, American film and television producer (b. 1916)
 Mort Shuman, American singer, pianist and songwriter (b. 1938)
 November 3 – Chris Bender, American musician (b. 1972)
 November 5 – Fred MacMurray, American actor (b. 1908)
 November 6 – Gene Tierney, American actress (b. 1920)
 November 8 – John Kirkpatrick, American pianist and music scholar (b. 1905)
 November 14 – Tony Richardson, English film and theater director (b. 1928)
 November 19 – Reggie Nalder, Austrian actor (b. 1907)
 November 21 – Daniel Mann, American film director (b. 1912)
 November 23 – Klaus Kinski, German actor (b. 1926)
 November 24
 Eric Carr, American drummer (b. 1950)
 Anton Furst, American art director (b. 1944)
 November 25 – Eleanor Audley, American actress (b. 1905)
 November 26 
 Carl G. Fenner, American botanist (b. 1899)
 Ed Heinemann, American aircraft designer (b. 1908)
 Bob Johnson, American ice hockey coach (b. 1931)
 November 29
 Ralph Bellamy, American actor (b. 1904)
 Frank Yerby, American novelist (b. 1916)

December

 December 1 – George Stigler, American economist (b. 1911)
 December 5 – Richard Speck, American mass murderer (b. 1941)
 December 9 – Berenice Abbott, American photographer (b. 1898)
 December 10 – Greta Kempton, American artist (b. 1901)
 December 11 – Robert Q. Lewis, American radio and television personality (b. 1920)
 December 12 – Eleanor Boardman, American actress (b. 1898)
 December 19 – Howie Dallmar, American basketball player (b. 1922)
 December 21 – Sheldon Mayer, American author and illustrator (b. 1917)
 December 24 – Marguerite Williams, African American geologist (b. 1895)

See also 
 1991 in American television
 List of American films of 1991
 Timeline of United States history (1990–2009)

References

External links
 

 
1990s in the United States
United States
United States
Years of the 20th century in the United States